This is the list of music recordings produced by the legendary Japanese singer-songwriter Miyuki Nakajima. She has released 44 studio albums, 46 singles, 3 live albums, 11 live videos, and multiple compilations up to April 2022.

Chart positions listed here are provided by the Oricon Weekly Singles and Albums Charts, started in 1968 and 1970, respectively. The Japanese albums chart had been separated into LPs (started in 1970), cassette tapes (introduced in 1974), and compact discs (launched in 1985) charts until they were unified in January 1987. For the albums released before 1987, the position on the LP chart are prioritized in principle, except for the materials not issued on vinyl.

Studio albums

Live and other albums

Compilation albums
 中島みゆき THE BEST (Nakajima Miyuki the Best) (1986, Single collection)
 Singles (1987, Complete singles compilation)
 中島みゆき PRESENTS BEST SELECTION 16 (1989)
 Best Selection 2 (1992)
 Singles 2 (1994, Complete singles compilation)
 大吟醸 (Daiginjō) (1996)
 大銀幕 (Daiginmaku: Starring) (1998)
 Singles 2000 (2002, Complete singles compilation)
 元気ですか (Genki desuka) (2006)
 十二単〜Singles 4〜 (Jūnihitoe: Singles 4) (2013)
 "縁会 2012～3 -LIVE SELECTION-" 2014

Singles

Videography

References

Japanese Wiki 
中島みゆき(Miyuki Nakajima)

 
Discographies of Japanese artists
Folk music discographies